Luca Cupido (born 9 November 1995) is an American water polo player born in Italy who played for the University of California, Berkeley. He was part of the American team at the 2016 Summer Olympics, where the team finished in tenth place.

In 2021, Cupido was nominated for his second Olympics with Team USA for the 2020 Tokyo Olympics.

References

External links
 

1995 births
Living people
American male water polo players
Olympic water polo players of the United States
Water polo players at the 2016 Summer Olympics
Pan American Games gold medalists for the United States
Pan American Games medalists in water polo
Water polo players at the 2015 Pan American Games
Newport Harbor High School alumni
Water polo players at the 2019 Pan American Games
Medalists at the 2015 Pan American Games
Medalists at the 2019 Pan American Games
Water polo players at the 2020 Summer Olympics